George Tankard Garrison (January 14, 1835 – November 14, 1889) was a U.S. Representative from Virginia.

Early life and education
Born in Accomack County, Virginia, Garrison was graduated from Dickinson College, Carlisle, Pennsylvania, in 1853 and from the law department of the University of Virginia, Charlottesville, Virginia, in 1857.

Career
He was admitted to the bar and commenced practice in Accomac.
He served as a private in the Confederate States Army during the Civil War.
He served as member of the Virginia House of Delegates during the period 1861–1863.
He served in the Senate of Virginia in the years 1863–1865.
He resumed the practice of law and also engaged in agricultural pursuits.

Garrison was elected judge of the eighth Virginia circuit in 1870 and subsequently judge of the seventeenth circuit.

Garrison was elected as a Democrat to the Forty-seventh Congress (March 4, 1881 – March 3, 1883).
He successfully contested the election of Robert M. Mayo to the Forty-eighth Congress and served from March 20, 1884, to March 3, 1885.
He resumed the practice of law.

Later life and death
Garrison was elected judge of the county court of Accomack County, Virginia.
He died at Accomac, Virginia, November 14, 1889.
He was interred in Edge Hill Cemetery.

Elections
1880; Garrison was elected to the U.S. House of Representatives with 48.17% of the vote, defeating Republican John W. Woltz and Readjuster John Critcher.
1882; Garrison initially lost re-election to Readjuster Robert Murphy Mayo by one vote.  The result of the race was contested and Garrison was seated in the House for a second term.

Notes

Sources

1835 births
1889 deaths
Virginia lawyers
Democratic Party members of the Virginia House of Delegates
Democratic Party Virginia state senators
Confederate States Army soldiers
Democratic Party members of the United States House of Representatives from Virginia
19th-century American politicians
People from Accomac, Virginia
19th-century American judges
19th-century American lawyers
Virginia circuit court judges